Benjamin Eggleston (January 3, 1816 – February 9, 1888) was a U.S. Representative from Ohio.

Life and career
Born in Corinth, New York, Eggleston completed preparatory studies.  He moved with his parents to Hocking County, Ohio, in 1831.  He moved to Cleveland and worked on a canal boat, later becoming an owner of boats and interested in several companies.  He settled in Cincinnati in 1845 and engaged in mercantile pursuits.  He was elected presiding officer of the city council of Cincinnati.  He served as delegate to the Republican National Convention in 1860. Presidential elector for Lincoln/Hamlin in 1860. He served as member of the Ohio Senate 1862–1865.

Eggleston was elected as a Republican to the Thirty-ninth and Fortieth Congresses (March 4, 1865 – March 3, 1869).  He was an unsuccessful candidate for reelection in 1868 to the Forty-first Congress.  He again served in the Ohio Senate in 1880 and 1881.  He resumed mercantile pursuits.  He died in Cincinnati, Ohio, February 9, 1888.  He was interred in Spring Grove Cemetery.

Sources

1816 births
1888 deaths
Republican Party members of the United States House of Representatives from Ohio
Politicians from Cincinnati
Burials at Spring Grove Cemetery
People from Corinth, New York
Cincinnati City Council members
Republican Party Ohio state senators
1860 United States presidential electors
People from Hocking County, Ohio
19th-century American politicians